The Zebra Force (Codename: Zebra, USA title) is a 1976 American film directed by Joe Tornatore. The film is about a group of Vietnam War veterans who declare war on Los Angeles drug dealers and the Mafia. The film is also known as Code Name: Zebra (US) and Commando Zebra (Italy). A sequel by Joe Tornatore with Mike Lane, also named Code Name: Zebra followed in 1987.

Plot
The film opens with a raid on an illegal casino performed by a group of blacks with automatic weapons. The audience discovers the perpetrators are white disguised as blacks. The story moves to a Vietnam War flashbacks with a patrol being ambushed by the Vietcong, and the resulting firefight. The leader of the vigilante veterans is a man known simply as the Lieutenant who was their platoon leader and disfigured in the action. Recuperating in a hospital he regroups the survivors for a series of escalating raids to not only to enrich themselves, but to wipe out organised criminal gangs involved in illegal gambling and narcotics distribution.

The main protagonist of the film is Carmine Longo, a Mafia enforcer sent to meet with local chief to discover who performed the action. The two are assisted by a corrupt Los Angeles Police Department detective sergeant.  Their suspicion falls on their only known suspects, a gang of drug dealing black criminals who deny their involvement. Longo schemes to eliminate them through their police contact who will set up a drug deal where they can be killed by the police.

Cast
 Mike Lane as Carmine Longo
 Richard X. Slattery as Charlie DeSantis
 Rockne Tarkington as Earl Lovington
 Timothy Brown as Jim Bob Cougar
 Glenn Wilder as Lieutenant Dan
 Anthony Caruso as Salvatore Moreno  
 Stafford Morgan as Sergeant Stangman  
 Clay Tanner as Lieutenant Claymore  
 Tony Cristino as Willie  
 Mario Milano as Peter  
 David Ankrum as Art  
 Buddy Ochoa as Larry  
 Patrick Strong as Nick  
 Bernard Tierman as Ernie

Notes

External links
 
 
 
 
 
 
 Zebra Force at Letterboxd

1970s crime action films
1976 directorial debut films
1976 films
American crime action films
American vigilante films
1970s English-language films
Films about veterans
Films scored by Charles Bernstein
Golan-Globus films
Vietnam War films
1970s American films